Yelena Mikhailovna Godina (born 17 September 1977, in Sverdlovsk) is a Russian volleyball player, who was a member of the national team that won the gold medal at 2006 Volleyball World Championship in Japan and the silver medal at the 2000 Summer Olympics in Sydney.  She also competed at the 1996 and 2008 Summer Olympics. She participated at the  2004 FIVB World Grand Prix.

Notes
Height: 1.97 m
Weight: 73 kg
Shoe size: 47 (EU) / 14 (US)

Honours
 1998 World Championship – 3rd place
 1999 World Cup – 2nd place
 2000 Olympic Games – 2nd place
 2002 World Championship – 3rd place
 2006 World Championship – 1st place
 2008 Olympic Games – 6th  place

Individual awards
 1999 FIVB World Grand Prix "Best Blocker"
 2006 World Championship "Best Server"

References

1977 births
Living people
Sportspeople from Yekaterinburg
Russian women's volleyball players
Eczacıbaşı volleyball players
Volleyball players at the 1996 Summer Olympics
Volleyball players at the 2000 Summer Olympics
Volleyball players at the 2008 Summer Olympics
Olympic volleyball players of Russia
Olympic silver medalists for Russia
Olympic medalists in volleyball
Medalists at the 2000 Summer Olympics